Shea Lacey (born 14 April 2007) is an English footballer who plays as a winger for Manchester United.

Early life
Lacey was born in Liverpool, and is the younger brother of fellow footballers Paddy and Luis Lacey. Unlike his brothers, who both support Liverpool, Lacey grew up supporting Manchester United. He started playing football at the age of three, and also had an interest in boxing as a child.

Club career
After his brother Paddy had rejected Manchester United in favour of Liverpool, their father decided that Luis and Shea would join the Manchester United academy due to the facilities and development opportunities being, in his opinion, of a better standard.

Lacey's impressive performances at youth level lead to him being called up to the Manchester United under-18 side, making his debut at the age of fourteen. He also featured at the REWE Junior Cup in Gottingen, Germany, as well as a number of other international youth tournaments. He scored his first goal at under-18 level in a 3–3 draw with Wolverhampton Wanderers.

He made his debut for the Manchester United under-21 side in a friendly against Dutch side Feyenoord.

International career
Lacey has represented England at under-15 and under-16 level.

Style of play
Comfortable playing in a number of positions, Lacey has been utilised at right-wing for Manchester United's under-18 side, but can also play as an attacking midfielder. He is left-footed, and described as a free kick specialist.

References

External links
 

2007 births
Living people
Footballers from Liverpool
English footballers
England youth international footballers
Association football wingers
Association football midfielders
Manchester United F.C. players